Martha Julia Farah (born 30 August 1955) is a cognitive neuroscience researcher at the University of Pennsylvania.  She has worked on an unusually wide range of topics; the citation for her lifetime achievement award from the Association for Psychological Science states that “Her studies on the topics of mental imagery, face recognition, semantic memory, reading, attention, and executive functioning have become classics in the field.” 

Farah has undergraduate degrees in Metallurgy and Philosophy from MIT, and a doctorate in Psychology from Harvard University. She has taught at Carnegie Mellon University and at the University of Pennsylvania, where she is now Walter H. Annenberg Professor of Natural Sciences and Director of the Center for Neuroscience & Society.

Early work
Farah’s early work focused on the neural bases of vision and memory.  In her 1990 book,  Visual Agnosia: Disorders of Object Recognition and What They Tell Us about Normal Vision (MIT Press), she framed many of the questions about visual recognition that the next two decades of cognitive neuroscience research addressed.  These questions include whether the human brain uses a general-purpose pattern recognition system for all classes of visual object or whether there is specialization for face recognition and/or printed word recognition, and whether semantic memory knowledge is organized in the brain by category (e.g., living vs nonliving things) or modality (e.g. visual vs motoric information).  Her research revealed a striking degree of division of labor, with specialized systems for a various categories of stimuli and types of information, and was summarized in The Cognitive Neuroscience of Vision (Wiley-Blackwell, 2000) and in the second edition of Visual Agnosia  (MIT Press, 2004).

Farah was also among the first information-processing psychologists to use the behavior of neurological patients to test cognitive theories, starting in the early 1980s.  At this time, cognition was understood by analogy with computers  –  mind is to brain as software is to hardware  –  and the difficulty of understanding a computer’s programs by exploring the effects of hardware “lesions” discouraged the use of neuropsychological methods in cognitive science.  This criticism is only valid for certain types of computational architectures, and one of Farah’s contributions was to develop parallel distributed processing models of neuropsychological impairments.

Current focus
In recent years, Farah has shifted her research focus to a new set of issues that lie at the interface between cognitive neuroscience and the real world. She was an early and influential participant in the field of neuroethics, the study of the societal and ethical implications of neuroscience. She was one of the founders of the International Neuroethics Society in 2006. Farah was also on the list of special guests invited to the Bilderberg meetings in May 2008. Some of her current research concerns the interaction between poverty and brain development.  In August 2009, she was appointed Director of the Center for Neuroscience & Society at the University of Pennsylvania. Since November 2010, Martha Farah is member of the Board of Director of the Society for Social Neuroscience.

See also
Prosopagnosia
Neuroethics
Center for Neuroscience & Society

External links
Society for Social Neuroscience.
New Society for Social Neuroscience to help guide emerging field from the University of Chicago News Office.

References

1955 births
Living people
American women psychologists
American cognitive neuroscientists
Fellows of the Society of Experimental Psychologists
Fellows of the American Association for the Advancement of Science
Massachusetts Institute of Technology alumni
Harvard Graduate School of Arts and Sciences alumni
Carnegie Mellon University faculty
University of Pennsylvania faculty
Walter H. Annenberg Professor
Fellows of the Cognitive Science Society